Jean McNeil, born 1968, is a Canadian fiction and travel author. She is a Reader in Creative Writing and co-convenor of the MA in Creative Writing (Prose Fiction) at the University of East Anglia.

She grew up on Cape Breton Island in Nova Scotia. She presently lives in London, England.

Awards and recognition 
 Winner, Grand Prize and Adventure Travel category at the Banff Mountain Film Festival Book Awards Book Competition for Ice Diaries: an Antarctic Memoir, 2016.
 Nominated for a Canadian National Magazine Award for 'Ice Diaries: A Climate Change Memoir,' (extract from book in progress) 2013.
 Awarded a Canada Council Grant for the Arts, 2013.
 Finalist, Prism International prize for creative non-fiction, for 'The Skeleton Coast', Vancouver, Canada, 2013.
 Nominated for the 2013 Pushcart Prize, USA for 'Ice Diaries', published 2012.
 Winner, Prism International prize for creative non-fiction, for 'Ice Diaries: A Climate Change Memoir', Vancouver, Canada, 2012.
 Shortlisted for the BBC/AHRC New Generation Thinkers scheme, 2012.
 Winner, Walkopedia travel writing award, 2011.
 Shortlisted, Metcalfe-Rooke award for an unpublished novel manuscript, for Fire on the Mountain, 2011.
 Awarded British Antarctic Survey/Arts Council England International Fellowship to Antarctica, 2005
 Nominated, Governor General's Award for English-language fiction, Canada, 2003
 Awarded Canada Council Award for the Arts, 2002.
 Awarded London Arts Board Award for the Arts, 1997.
 Shortlisted, Journey Prize for short fiction (Canada), 1997.
 Winner, Prism International short story competition, 1997.

Bibliography 
 Hunting Down Home (UK: Phoenix 1996, US: Milkweed Editions 1999) 
 Nights in a Foreign Country (2000) 
 Costa Rica (2001) 
 Private View (2002) 
 The Interpreter of Silences (2006) 
 The Ice Lovers (2009) 
 Night Orders: Poems from Antarctica and the Arctic (2011) 
 Ice Diaries: an Antarctic Memoir (2016) 
 The Dhow House (2016) 
 Fire on the Mountain (2018)

References

Further reading
 Mary Conde: Old Europe and New World: A reading of Catherine Bush's "The Rules of Engagement" and Jean McNeil's "Private View," in Narratives of crisis – crisis of narrative, Martin Kuester, ed., with Françoise LeJeune, Anca-Raluca Radu, Charlotte Sturgess. Wißner, Augsburg 2012  (Studies in anglophone literatures and cultures, 3) pp. 67 – 76

External links 
 Official website
 Jean McNeil at uea.ac.uk

Living people
20th-century Canadian novelists
21st-century Canadian novelists
Canadian expatriates in England
Canadian women novelists
Canadian travel writers
Women travel writers
Writers from Nova Scotia
20th-century Canadian women writers
21st-century Canadian women writers
Canadian expatriate writers
Canadian women non-fiction writers
Year of birth missing (living people)